Marc Joseph Symington (born 10 January 1980) is an English cricketer. Born in Newcastle-upon-Tyne, Marc is 5’11” and he is a right-handed batsman and a right-arm pace bowler. He played first-class and List A cricket for Durham between 1998 and 2002, and later appeared in Minor Counties and List A games for Northumberland.

References

1980 births
Living people
English cricketers
Durham cricketers
Cricketers from Newcastle upon Tyne
Northumberland cricketers